Eduard Orth (October 13, 1902 – March 31, 1968) was a German politician of the Christian Democratic Union (CDU) and former member of the German Bundestag.

Life 
In the first Bundestag election in 1949, he came to the German Bundestag by winning a direct mandate in the Speyer constituency and was re-elected in 1953. After his appointment as Minister of Education of Rhineland-Palatinate, he resigned from the Bundestag on October 7, 1956. From 1959 until his death he was a member of the Rhineland-Palatinate state parliament.

Literature

References

1902 births
1968 deaths
Members of the Bundestag for Rhineland-Palatinate
Members of the Bundestag 1953–1957
Members of the Bundestag 1949–1953
Members of the Bundestag for the Christian Democratic Union of Germany
Members of the Landtag of Rhineland-Palatinate